Falaver-e Pain (also Romanized as Falāver-e Pā’īn) is a village in Baqerabad Rural District, in the Central District of Mahallat County, Markazi Province, Iran. At the 2006 census, its population was 35, in 8 families.

References 

Populated places in Mahallat County